Turf City MRT station is a future underground Mass Rapid Transit station on the Cross Island line (CRL) located in Bukit Timah, Singapore. First announced in September 2022, the station is expected to be completed in 2032 along with the other CRL Phase 2 stations.

History
Turf City station was first announced on 20 September 2022 by Transport Minister S Iswaran. The station will be constructed as part of Phase 2 of the Cross Island line (CRL), a  segment spanning six stations from this station to Jurong Lake District station. The station is expected to be completed in 2032.

Built to serve a new residential development at Turf City, the tenants of the sports complex had to move out before the end of 2023.

Through environmental impact studies, the station site was shifted slightly south from its original planned alignment. This was to limit the construction area needed to build the station, reducing the impact on the wildlife in the surrounding forested area.

Details
The station will serve the Cross Island line (CRL) and have an official station code of CR14. It will be located in the existing Turf Club City and The Grandstand.

References

Bibliography

External links

Proposed railway stations in Singapore
Mass Rapid Transit (Singapore) stations
Railway stations scheduled to open in 2032